Patrick Maloney is a former Democratic member of the Kansas House of Representatives, who represented the 116th district.  He was appointed in January 2009 to replace Dennis McKinney. Maloney lost his re-election bid to Republican Kyle Hoffman in the 2010 election.

Committee membership
 Transportation
 Agriculture and Natural Resources

References

External links
 Kansas Legislature - Patrick Maloney
 Project Vote Smart profile
 Kansas Votes profile

Democratic Party members of the Kansas House of Representatives
Living people
Year of birth missing (living people)
21st-century American politicians